Smackgirl was a Japanese mixed martial arts promotion focused solely on female fighters. The promotion also held grappling and amateur events along with its main line of professional MMA cards. After financial difficulties throughout 2008 the promotion was sold to Marverous Japan Co.,Ltd. and rebranded JEWELS.

Unlike conventional MMA in Japan, Smackgirl did not allow striking to the head while in a grounded position. There was also a 30-second limit for ground fighting but it was abolished by 2008. There were four weight classes: flyweight (under 48 kg), lightweight (under 52 kg), middleweight (under 58 kg), and openweight (no limit).

Rules

Weight classes
Flyweight (-)
Lightweight (-)
Middleweight (-)
Open weight

Former champions

Open division

Middleweight

Lightweight

Flyweight

Events

See also
Jewels
List of Deep champions
List of Deep events
Deep Jewels events
Jewels (mixed martial arts)
List of female mixed martial artists

References

External links
Official website (Internet Archive)
Smackgirl event results at sherdog

2001 establishments in Japan
2008 disestablishments in Japan
Entertainment companies established in 2001
Companies disestablished in 2008
Mixed martial arts organizations
Women's mixed martial arts